Justin Robinson may refer to:

Justin Robinson (basketball, born 1987), British basketball player; in college played for Rider (2007–11)
Justin Robinson (basketball, born 1995), American basketball player; in college played for Monmouth (2013–17)
Justin Robinson (basketball, born 1996), American basketball player for Mornar Bar
Justin Robinson (basketball, born 1997), American basketball player; in college played for Virginia Tech (2015–19) 
Justin Robinson (musician) (born 1968), American saxophonist
Justin Robinson (sprinter) (born 2002), American sprinter